The 2008 Masters of Curling was held November 12-16, 2008 at the Waterloo Memorial Recreation Complex in Waterloo, Ontario.

Glenn Howard's rink won their third straight Masters tournament, defeating Kevin Koe's rink in the final. The event is not to be confused with the January event that happened in the same year, but the previous season. Both events featured Howard defeating Koe in the final.

Draw

Pool A

Pool B

Pool C

Playoffs
Tie breakers:
Stoughton 7-6 Burtnyk 
Koe 5-4 Ulsrud

External links
WCT Event site

Masters Of Curling (November), 2008
Sport in Waterloo, Ontario
Curling in Ontario
2008 in Ontario
Masters (curling)